Yannis Christopoulos (alternate spelling: Giannis) (born on 7 June 1974 in Patras) is a Greek professional basketball coach for Promitheas Patras of the Greek Basket League and the EuroCup.

Coaching career
Christopoulos began his coaching career in 1996, at the age of 22, with the youth departments of the Romanian club CS Universitatea Mobitelco Cluj-Napoca. He then became an assistant coach with Apollon Patras, where he worked under head coach Dirk Bauermann. He also worked as an assistant coach under Bauermann in the German club Brandt Hagen.

Christopoulos' career as a club head coach started in 2004, in Cyprus, with Proteas EKA AEL. He was also the head coach of Apollon Patras. As the head coach of APOEL, he won the Cypriot League championship in 2010.

He became an assistant coach under Dirk Bauermann again, this time with Bayern Munich. After Bauermann left as Bayern's head coach, on 27 September 2012, Christopoulos was promoted to be the team's new head coach for the 2012–13 season. However, on 27 November 2012, he was replaced as the team's head coach by Svetislav Pešić.

Awards and accomplishments
 Cypriot League champion: 2010
 Cypriot Super Cup winner: 2011

External links
 Giannis Christopoulos GPK Sports Management CB

1974 births
Living people
Sportspeople from Patras
Greek basketball coaches
Apollon Patras B.C. coaches
Olympias Patras B.C. coaches
A.E.L. 1964 B.C. coaches
Trikala B.C. coaches
FC Bayern Munich basketball coaches
Promitheas Patras B.C. coaches